Lucille Carlisle (August 31, 1895 – October 19, 1958), born Ida Lucile White, was an American actress.

Early life 
Ida Lucile White was born in Galesburg, Illinois, the daughter of Frank White and Della Pope White. Both parents were born in Canada. In childhood, she moved to Spokane, Washington, with her family.

Career 
After winning a beauty contest sponsored by Photoplay magazine, and a brief career on stage, Carlisle began making silent films for Vitagraph Studios, with comedian and director Larry Semon. Together they made 25 films. After their professional and personal relationship ended, she also left film work. She was heard on radio in the 1930s and 1940s, representing Mothers of America, an anti-war organization.

Films Carlisle appeared in included Boodle and Bandits (1918), Pluck and Plotters (1918), Scamps and Scandals (1919), Well, I'll Be (1919), Passing the Buck (1919), The Star Boarder (1919), His Home Sweet Home (1919), The Simple Life (1919), Between the Acts (1919), Dull Care (1919), Dew Drop Inn (1919), The Head Waiter (1919), The Grocery Clerk (1919), The Fly Cop (1920), Solid Concrete (1920), The Stage Hand (1920), The Suitor (1920), School Days (1920), The Sportsman (1921), The Show (1922), A Pair of Kings (1922), Golf (1922), The Agent (1922), The Counter Jumper (1922), and No Wedding Bells (1923).

Personal life 
Lucille White married Elder J. Zintheo briefly in 1912; their divorce became final in 1916. Carlisle and Larry Semon were a couple on and off from 1918 to 1923. In 1924, her experiences with rhinoplasty were described in front-page headlines. In 1927 she married a Canadian businessman, Leigh Hacking Millikin. She died in 1958, aged 63 years, in Los Angeles. Her gravesite is at Forest Lawn Cemetery in Glendale, California.

References

External links 
 
 

1895 births
1958 deaths
American stage actresses
American silent film actresses
20th-century American actresses
People from Galesburg, Illinois
Burials at Forest Lawn Memorial Park (Glendale)